Rareș Andrei Ilie (born 19 April 2003) is a Romanian professional footballer who plays as an attacking midfielder for Israeli Premier League club Maccabi Tel Aviv, on loan from Ligue 1 club Nice.

He started out as a senior with Rapid București at age 17, amassing over 50 matches in the first two leagues combined before signing for French team Nice in 2022.

At international level, Ilie has represented the under-18, under-19 and  under-21 sides of Romania.

Club career

Rapid București
Ilie made his senior debut for Rapid București on 5 September 2020, aged 17, in a 2–1 victory over Pandurii Târgu Jiu in the Liga II championship. On 19 November that year, he scored his first goal in a 1–0 league win against Universitatea Cluj. Ilie amassed three goals from 22 appearances during his debut season in Bucharest, with "the White-Burgundies" finishing as Liga II runners-up and thus earning direct promotion.

On 18 July 2021, Ilie recorded his professional debut by starting in a 1–0 Liga I defeat of Chindia Târgoviște. His first goal in the competition came on 19 November, in a 2–2 away draw against the same opponent. Ilie contributed with 38 games and six goals in all competitions during the 2021–22 campaign, being one of the most proficient players of Rapid București.

Nice
On 14 July 2022, Rapid București shareholder Victor Angelescu announced an agreement for the move of Ilie to Ligue 1 club Nice. The French side officialised his signing three days later, and press generally reported the transfer fee as being €5 million plus bonuses.

Ilie made his debut on 7 August 2022, coming on as a 64th-minute substitute for Alexis Beka Beka in a 1–1 league draw at Toulouse, and one week later started in a 1–1 home draw with Strasbourg. On the 18th, he registered his European debut in a 0–1 away loss to Maccabi Tel Aviv in the UEFA Europa Conference League play-off round.

Maccabi Tel Aviv 
On 1 February 2023, Ilie signed for Maccabi Tel Aviv on loan from Nice.

Career statistics

Club

References

External links
  
 
 

1999 births
Living people
Romanian footballers
Footballers from Bucharest
FC Rapid București players
OGC Nice players
Maccabi Tel Aviv F.C. players
Liga I players
Liga II players
Ligue 1 players
Israeli Premier League players
Romanian expatriate footballers
Expatriate footballers in France
Expatriate footballers in Israel
Romanian expatriate sportspeople in France
Romanian expatriate sportspeople in Israel
Romania under-21 international footballers
Romania youth international footballers
Association football midfielders